Stolen is a 2012 American action thriller film directed by Simon West and starring Nicolas Cage, Danny Huston, Malin Åkerman, M. C. Gainey, Sami Gayle, Mark Valley and Josh Lucas. The film follows a former thief who has 12 hours to find $10 million and save his daughter from his former partner. It was released in the United States on September 14, 2012.

Plot

In New Orleans, Will Montgomery and Vincent Kinsey are preparing for a heist, aided by Riley, their getaway driver, and Hoyt, a computer security expert. They are watched by FBI agent Tim Harland, who knows that Will and Vincent have been casing a jewelry store for several weeks and plans to arrest them mid-crime.

Will and Vincent break into the neighboring toy store, blowing the adjacent wall. Harland gives them a few minutes before sending his agents into the jewelry store, but Will and Vincent are not there, having instead used the toy store to gain access to a bank. In the vault, Will collects $10 million in wrapped bills and drags away Vincent, who had been eyeing a stack of gold bars. They come across a janitor in a back alley. Vincent attempts to kill the man, but Will stops him, and Vincent accidentally shoots himself in the leg. As their escape van pulls up, Vincent gets in and drives off, leaving Will stranded with the money and the FBI closing fast. After a car chase, Will is cornered in an abandoned building. Agents arrest him but find no evidence of the money.

Eight years later, Will is released from prison. He is taken back to New Orleans by Harland, believing that Will stashed the money before his arrest. He warns that he will be watching Will closely. Will returns to his daughter Alison, finding that she is struggling with abandonment issues. She refuses to let him talk to her, instead handing over a package addressed to him that was left there that morning. She goes off in a taxi, which is shown to have been trailing Will since his release.

Will goes to a nearby bar where Riley is working. As they talk, the package starts to ring. Will finds a cell phone inside, and the caller reveals himself as Vincent, the driver of the taxi, who has now kidnapped Alison, and he demands the $10 million from the heist within 12 hours. Vincent says he will be tracking Will via the phone and will make regular calls that Will must answer or Alison will die. Vincent drugs Alison and locks her in the taxi's trunk (killing a motorcycle cop in the process).

Will, aware that Harland's men are also following him, uses the Fat Tuesday celebration to escape. He purchases a second cell phone to redirect calls from the first, then plants the first phone on a leaving train to throw Vincent's tracking off. Will explains the situation to Harland, vowing that he burnt the $10 million just before he was arrested, and asks for help. Harland rejects this, showing that Vincent was reported dead a year prior, a burnt body identified by DNA.

Will is forced to steal FBI credentials to find the current address of Hoyt, who is revealed to be working with Vincent and helping to track the phone. They have a brief standoff (in which Hoyt reveals Vincent lost his leg, which affected his sense of touch due to the gunshot he received) before the FBI agents arrive and kill Hoyt before he can fire on them. Will escapes, then talks to the taxi dispatcher, where they help identify Vincent's taxi and current location. In a celebration parade, Will finds that the taxi belongs to another driver, and that Vincent has masked the taxi number and stashed his cab's GPS system in the car.

Will is captured again by Harland's men, but when they do not let him answer Vincent's call, Will escapes after crashing the vehicle. On the call, Will tries to explain the money is gone, but Vincent doesn't believe it at first, then states Will must come up with a way to replace Vincent's lost share, reminding him of the deadline.

Will gets an idea. With Riley's help, they tunnel up below the bank where the gold was stashed and use a thermal lance to melt enough of the gold before their actions are detected. Riley drives off to distract Harland. Will takes the gold to Vincent at an abandoned amusement park, but Vincent lights the taxi on fire with Alison still inside. Will and Vincent fight, and Will takes a gunshot. He still manages to douse Vincent in gasoline and set him ablaze, giving him time to drive the taxi, first straight into Vincent, then into a nearby pond.

As he races to free Alison from the submerging vehicle, Will is attacked by a now disfigured Vincent, (who due to his nerve damage doesn't feel his injuries) but impales him on a crowbar. Will rescues Alison, while locking a dying Vincent into said trunk of his sinking taxi, before collapsing on dry land just as Harland arrives in a helicopter. Harland assures Alison that Will will be okay, convinced now of Vincent's guilt, and Will is taken to get medical attention.

Sometime later, Will, Riley, and Alison are enjoying an afternoon barbecue, still being watched by Harland from a distance because some of the bank gold is still missing. Will finds a chunk of the melted gold in Riley's truck—the missing amount—and he and Riley debate whether to keep it or throw it away, the latter clearing Will of any wrongdoing. After a thought, Will throws the gold into a bayou, leaving Harland without any evidence, so he ends his monitoring. Unknown to Harland, Will threw away a decoy, and leaves the nugget on the table as the three go to enjoy lunch.

Cast
 Nicolas Cage as Will Montgomery
 Danny Huston as Agent Tim Harland 
 Malin Åkerman as Riley Simms
 Sami Gayle as Alison Montgomery
 Mark Valley as Agent Fletcher
 M. C. Gainey as Donald Hoyt
 Josh Lucas as Vincent Kinsey
 Tanc Sade as Peter
 Demetrice J. Nguyen as Mark
 Sam Velasquez as Knuckles

Production
Filming began March 2012 in New Orleans. It was released in U.S. theaters on September 14, 2012, and by Lionsgate in the UK on March 22, 2013.

Reception
On Rotten Tomatoes, the film holds an approval rating of 20% based on 20 reviews, with an average rating of 4.01/10. On Metacritic the film has a weighted average score of 43 out of 100, based on four critics, indicating "mixed or average reviews".

Stolen was a box office bomb in the United States, receiving little publicity and grossing just $183,125 across 141 screens on its opening weekend. The film was pulled from theaters after two weeks, making a total of $304,318. The film grossed $17,967,746 worldwide.

References

External links
 
 

2012 films
2012 action thriller films
2010s chase films
2012 crime action films
2012 crime thriller films
2010s heist films
2010s road movies
2012 psychological thriller films
American action thriller films
American chase films
American crime thriller films
American heist films
American crime action films
American road movies
Films set in amusement parks
Films about child abduction in the United States
Films about bank robbery
American films about revenge
Films directed by Simon West
Films scored by Mark Isham
Films set in New Orleans
Films shot in New Orleans
Nu Image films
Saturn Films films
Wonderland Sound and Vision films
2010s English-language films
2010s American films